Vertical Limit is a 2000 American survival thriller film directed by Martin Campbell, written by Robert King, and starring Chris O'Donnell, Bill Paxton, Robin Tunney, and Scott Glenn. The film was released on December 8, 2000, in the United States by Columbia Pictures, receiving mixed reviews and grossed $215 million at the box office.

The film was the third collaboration between Campbell and actor Stuart Wilson, after No Escape (1994) and The Mask of Zorro (1998).

Plot
While climbing in Monument Valley, siblings Peter and Annie Garrett lose their father, Royce. After two falling climbers leave the family dangling, Royce forces Peter to cut him loose in order to save Peter and Annie. Three years later, Peter has retired from climbing, but Annie has become a renowned climber. Their relationship is strained, as Annie still blames Peter for Royce's death. Peter reunites with Annie at the K2 base camp, where Annie is planning a summit attempt on K2. The expedition is funded by wealthy industrialist Elliot Vaughn. Their team includes Annie, Vaughn, renowned climber Tom McLaren, mountaineer Ali Nazir, and one other.

The night before the climb, Vaughn throws a party. The gala is interrupted by reclusive Montgomery Wick, reportedly the foremost K2 expert, who verbally challenges Vaughn. It's later revealed that Wick's wife, an expedition guide, died during Vaughn's previous expedition. Vaughn claims they were hit by a storm and Wick's wife died of pulmonary edema because her supply of dexamethasone was swept away in the storm. Wick has never believed that story and has spent years trying to find his wife's body. Back in the present day, Vaughn forces McLaren to continue despite a radio warning from base camp of an approaching storm. An avalanche occurs, and Annie, Vaughn, and McLaren become trapped in a crevasse, while the other two are killed. Radio contact is lost, but Peter hears Annie using static and Morse code to signal that they are alive. Peter assembles a rescue team, which includes Wick. Pairs are assigned, and after a treacherous helicopter drop-off, each pair takes a different path to increase chances of success. Each pair carries a canister of explosive nitroglycerine donated by the Pakistani army to clear the entrance to the crevasse.

Monique and Cyril experience a harrowing incident after Cyril loses his balance at the edge of a cliff. While Monique attempts to rescue him their nitro canister falls over the cliff and explodes, causing another avalanche. Monique survives but Cyril does not. At the military station the nitroglycerine canisters are exposed to sunlight and explode. Base camp tells the team to get their cases of nitro into the shade. Kareem and Malcolm do so, but their canister leaks fluid into the sunlight, causing another explosion that kills them. Underground, McLaren is severely injured and has lost his dexamethasone. Annie shares her dex with him, but Vaughn refuses it. Annie risks her life to reach Ali's backpack and manages to obtain more dex, but Vaughn says that since McLaren is unlikely to survive, he and Annie should keep the dex for themselves.

The explosions have shaken loose some ice, and Wick finally discovers his wife's body. The empty dex container nearby suggests that Vaughn lied and stole her dex, ensuring his own survival while leaving Wick's wife to die. Monique, Peter and Wick camp for the night. Peter is wary of Wick, who seems more intent on taking revenge than in rescuing the survivors. In the crevasse, Annie falls asleep, and Vaughn kills McLaren with a syringe full of air to avoid having to give McLaren more dex. Wick awakens to find that Peter and Monique have left without him. Annie and Vaughn manage to mark the crevasse entrance by detonating a flare inside a bag of McLaren's blood which explodes over the snow. Peter and Monique see the marker and use nitro to blast a hole, enabling access to the survivors. They drop a rope, and Vaughn harnesses Annie.

Wick descends into the cave, and although Vaughn thinks Wick will attack him, Wick attaches a clip to Vaughn. Monique and Peter attempt to pull Annie out of the crevasse, but an ice boulder falls, knocking Wick and Vaughn from the ledge in the crevice, and pulling Annie and Peter down, creating a scenario similar to the opening scene: Monique alone remains on the ledge holding the rope from which the other four are dangling. To save Annie and Peter and, to fulfill his desire for revenge against Vaughn, Wick cuts the rope and he and Vaughn fall to their deaths.

Recovering at base camp, Annie reconciles with Peter, who then pays his respects at a makeshift memorial for climbers who have died.

Cast
 Chris O'Donnell as Peter Garrett
 Bill Paxton as Elliot Vaughn
 Robin Tunney as Annie Garrett
 Scott Glenn as Montgomery Wick
 Izabella Scorupco as Monique Aubertine
 Temuera Morrison as Major Rasul
 Robert Taylor as Skip Taylor
 Stuart Wilson as Royce Garrett
 Nicholas Lea as Tom McLaren
 Alexander Siddig as Kareem Nazir
 David Hayman as Frank "Chainsaw" Williams
 Ben Mendelsohn as Malcolm Bench
 Steve Le Marquand as Cyril Bench
 Roshan Seth as Colonel Amir Salim
 Ed Viesturs has a cameo in the film, playing Himself as a mountain trainer.

Production
Vertical Limit was filmed on location in Pakistan (location of K2), Queenstown, New Zealand and the United States.

Bell 212 helicopters contracted from Hevilift Australia were painted in a khaki green colour to represent the Pakistani Air Force.

Reception

Box office
Vertical Limit grossed $69.2 million domestically and $215.7 million worldwide, becoming the 17th-highest-grossing film of 2000. Against a budget of $75 million, the film was a success.

In the United States, the film opened at No. 1 during its opening day, December 8, earning an estimated $5.1 million, overtaking How the Grinch Stole Christmas, which had stayed since November 17. On its opening weekend, the film finished second at the box office, with $15.5 million.

Critical reception
Vertical Limit received mixed reviews from critics, as the film holds a 48% rating on Rotten Tomatoes based on 110 reviews, with an average rating of 5.2/10. The website's critical consensus reads: "The plot in Vertical Limit is ludicrously contrived and clichéd. Meanwhile, the action sequences are so over-the-top and piled one on top of another, they lessen the impact on the viewer". On Metacritic, the film has a weighted average score of 48 out of 100, based on 29 critics, indicating "mixed or average reviews". According to free-soloing legend Alex Honnold, the unrealistic opening scene is "horrendous and probably the worst scene in all of Hollywood climbing".

Roger Ebert gave the film three stars out four, commenting, "It's made from obvious formulas and pulp novel conflicts, but strongly acted and well crafted... "Vertical Limit" delivers with efficiency and craft, and there are times, when the characters are dangling over a drop of a mile, when we don't even mind how it's manipulating us." James DiGiovanna of Tucson Weekly wrote, "...now O'Donnell brings his shockingly wholesome whiteness to Vertical Limit, the best mountain-climbing movie starring Chris O'Donnell to come out this week." Philip French of The Guardian mentioned, "Campbell sustains the tension pretty well and the settings are spectacular. More interesting than the characters, however, are two aspects of the dramatic background. The first is an isolated army post on a mountain peak from which ill-equipped Pakistani soldiers fire an artillery barrage every afternoon in the direction of India as an absurd daily ritual. The second is seeing rich, mindless Americans ruining a beautiful corner of the world in the name of self-discovery. They're a new class of anti-social climbers." David Ansen of Newsweek wrote, ""Vertical Limit" produces a decidedly split reaction in an audience. You gasp at the action sequences, then giggle at the drama, then gasp, then giggle until finally the filmmakers pile on one cliffhanger too many. By that point, the gasps have become muted by sheer disbelief... Alternately generating adrenaline and ennui, "Vertical Limit" battles itself to a hard-earned draw."

References

External links

2000 films
2000 drama films
2000 thriller drama films
2000s American films
2000s disaster films
2000s English-language films
2000s psychological drama films
American adventure drama films
American disaster films
American survival films
American thriller drama films
Avalanches in film
Columbia Pictures films
Films about death
Films about siblings
Films directed by Martin Campbell
Films scored by James Newton Howard
Films set in Gilgit-Baltistan
Films set in Pakistan
Films set in Utah
Films shot in New Zealand
K2
Military of Pakistan in films
Mountaineering films
Films shot in Monument Valley